Yagodnoye is a rural locality (a selo) in Selenginsky District, Republic of Buryatia, Russia. The population was 320 as of 2010. There are 5 streets.

Geography 
Yagodnoye is located 23 km north of Gusinoozyorsk (the district's administrative centre) by road. Tokhoy is the nearest rural locality.

References 

Rural localities in Selenginsky District